The Domesday Book of 1086 lists in the following order the tenants-in-chief in Cornwall of King William the Conqueror:
Osbern FitzOsbern (died 1103), Bishop of Exeter
Tavistock Church, Devon
The churches of various saints
St Michael's Church
Canons of St Stephen's
St Petroc's Church, Bodmin
Canons of St Achebran's
Canons of Probus
Canons of St Carantoc's
Canons of St Piran's
Canons of St Buryan's
Clergy of St Neot
Robert, Count of Mortain (died 1090), half-brother of the king
Juhel de Totnes (died 1123/30), feudal baron of Totnes
Gotshelm, brother of Walter de Claville

Sources

Thorn, Caroline & Frank, (eds.) Domesday Book, (Morris, John, gen. ed.) Vol. 10, Cornwall, Chichester: Phillimore, 1979

Domesday Book tenants-in-chief
Medieval Cornwall
Domesday